David Rigsbee (April 1, 1949) is  an American poet, contributing editor and regular book reviewer for The Cortland Review, and literary critic.

Career 
Rigsbee is the author of 20 books and chapbooks, including eleven full-length poetry collections. In addition to his poems, he has also published critical works on Carolyn Kizer and Joseph Brodsky. He has coedited two anthologies, including Invited Guest: An Anthology of Twentieth Century Southern Poetry, which was a ‘notable book’ selection of the American Library Association and the American Association of University Professors, and was featured on C-Span’s Booknotes program. His work has appeared in many journals, including AGNI, American Poetry Review, the Georgia Review, the Iowa Review, the New Yorker, the Ohio Review, Poetry, Prairie Schooner, Sewanee Review, and the Southern Review. 
 
Winner of a 2012 Pushcart Prize, the 2009 Black River Poetry Prize, the Vachel Lindsay Poetry Award and the Pound Prize, Rigsbee was also 2010 winner of the Sam Ragan Award for contribution to the arts in North Carolina, as well as winner of the Oscar Young Award for the best book by a North Carolina author (for The Red Tower: New and Selected Poems, 2010) and the Black River Chapbook Poetry Prize for 2009. He has received two creative writing fellowships from the NEA, as well as fellowships from the NEH, the Fine Arts Work Center in Provincetown, and the Virginia Commission on the Arts. He has also received residencies from the Djerassi Foundation and Jentel Foundation. 
 
Rigsbee's most recent books are a collection of essays on contemporary poetry, Not Alone in My Dancing: Essays and Reviews, published by Black Lawrence Press in 2016 and This Much I Can Tell You, also by Black Lawrence Press, in 2017.

Personal life 
Rigsbee was married to artist Jill Bullitt for eighteen years before they divorced.

Publications

Books

  "This Much I Can Tell You (poems), Black Lawrence Press, 2017
  "Not Alone in My Dancing:  Essays and Reviews" (criticism) Black Lawrence Press, 2016
  "School of the Americas" (poems) Black Lawrence Press, 2012
  "The Red Tower:  New and Selected Poems" (poems) NewSouth Books
 Two Estates (poems)  Cherry Grove Collections, 2009
 Cloud Journal (poems)  Turning Point Books, 2008
 The Dissolving Island (poems)  BkMk Press, University of Missouri at Kansas City, 2003
 Invited Guest: An Anthology of Twentieth Century Southern Poetry University of Virginia Press, 2001
 Styles of Ruin: Joseph Brodsky and the Postmodernist Elegy (criticism)  Greenwood Press, 1999
 A Skeptic's Notebook:  Longer Poems St. Andrews Press, 1997
 Trailers (prose) The University of Virginia Press, 1996
 Your Heart Will Fly Away (poems) The Smith, 1992
 An Answering Music: On the Poetry of Carolyn Kizer (criticism) Ford-Brown & Co., 1990
 The Hopper Light (poems) L'Epervier Press, 1988
 The Ardis Anthology of New American Poetry Ardis, 1977
 Stamping Ground (poems) Ardis Publishers, 1976

Chapbooks, Broadsides, and Miscellaneous
 "The Pilot House (poems) Black Lawrence Press, 2009
 Seen From Above, catalogue, Philip Govedare (painter), Francine Cedars Gallery, Seattle, 2008
 Sonnets to Hamlet  Pudding House, 2004
 Greatest Hits: 1975 - 2000 Pudding House, 2001
 Scenes on an Obelisk Pudding House, 2000
 To Be Here Coraddi Chapbook, 1980
 "Only Heaven," Willow Springs Broadsheet, 1993
 “Crickets,” Georgia Review broadside, 1985
 Poetry-in-Motion #7, Nobodaddy Press, 1977

Translations
Collected Poems in English. 2000 by Joseph Brodsky (poems translated with others), edited by Ann Kjellberg, Farrar, Straus & Giroux, 2000
A Part of Speech by Joseph Brodsky, Farrar, Straus & Giroux,1980
Poems of Mikhail Lermontov in Russian Romanticism Ardis, 1984

References

External links

The Poetry Foundation 
National Endowment for the Arts 
Black Lawrence Press 
David Rigsbee reads for The Cortland Review at AWP 2008 in New York. [www.youtube.com/watch?v=gdSPo4sTOKw]
 The Cortland Review. 

American male poets
American literary critics
Bullitt family
1949 births
Living people